Michelangelo Bernasconi (27 January 1901 – 21 March 1943), also known as Piastrella, was an Italian rower. He competed at the 1928 Summer Olympics in Amsterdam with the men's single sculls where he was eliminated in the round two repechage. He was killed in action in 1943 fighting in World War II in Tunisia.

References

1901 births
1943 deaths
Italian male rowers
Olympic rowers of Italy
Rowers at the 1928 Summer Olympics
Sportspeople from Como
Italian military personnel killed in World War II
European Rowing Championships medalists